Hildebrandshausen is a village and a former municipality in the Unstrut-Hainich-Kreis district of Thuringia, Germany. Since 1 December 2011, it is part of the municipality Südeichsfeld.

References

Former municipalities in Thuringia